Amine Aboulfath is a Moroccan professional footballer who plays as a centre-back for Wydad AC.

Club career

Wydad AC 
On September 10, 2022, he was established under his new coach Hussein Ammouta on the occasion of the final of the CAF Super Cup against RS Berkane.

Honours

Wydad AC 

 Botola: 2020–21, 2021–22
 CAF Champions League: 2021–22

References

1997 births
Living people
Moroccan footballers
Association football central defenders
Wydad AC players